Aristotelia hieroglyphica is a moth of the family Gelechiidae. It was described by Walsingham in 1909. It is found in Mexico (Tabasco).

The wingspan is about 11 mm. The forewings are dark fawn-brown, paler along the dorsal half, with a pale patch at the lower angle of the cell. A whitish cinereous fascia leaves the costa at about one-sixth, running obliquely outward to the fold, but not traceable below it, this fascia is somewhat widened, showing a tendency to reduplication by brown scales along its middle. Parallel with this is a short oblique costal streak before the middle, and beyond the middle is another, converging at its apex with a similar inverted costal streak from before the end of the wing, from the inner edge of the first a narrow line of the same colour crosses the fold inward, but does not reach the dorsum. Between these markings a slight suffusion of blackish scales extends from the base to the apex, and there are also some shining steel-grey scales about the ends of the second and third costal streaks, and in a small separate patch above the tornus. The hindwings are pale greyish fuscous, with a slight rosy tinge.

References

Moths described in 1909
Aristotelia (moth)
Moths of Central America